Eokinorhynchus is a Fortunian (earliest Cambrian) ecdysozoan known from three fossils.  It is interpreted as a stem-group Kinorhynch, which would make it by far the earliest and indeed only reported member of this group from the fossil record.

References

Kinorhyncha
Prehistoric protostome genera

Cambrian genus extinctions